Niveditha Vijayan credited as Baby Niveditha is a former Indian child actress who works predominantly in Malayalam films. She who the Kerala State Film Award for Best Child Artist in 2009 for her acting in Kaana Kanmani and Bhramaram.

Personal life
She is born as the second child to Vijayan and Praseetha who has settled in Abu Dhabi. She has an elder sister named Niranjana Vijayan who is also an actress.

Filmography

Awards

References

External links
 

Actresses from Kannur
Indian child actresses
Living people
Actresses in Malayalam cinema
Indian film actresses
21st-century Indian child actresses
Actresses in Tamil cinema
Child actresses in Malayalam cinema
Year of birth missing (living people)